Progress in Energy and Combustion Science is a bimonthly peer-reviewed review journal published by Elsevier. Established in 1975, the journal publishes review articles on all aspects of energy and combustion science. All contributions are by invitation of the editors-in-chief. The founding editor is Norman Chigier (Carnegie Mellon University). The current editors-in-chief are Hai Wang (Stanford University) and  Christof Schulz (University of Duisburg-Essen). 

According to the Journal Citation Reports, the journal has a 2021 impact factor of 35.339.

References

External links

Energy and fuel journals
English-language journals
Engineering journals
Elsevier academic journals
Publications established in 1975
Bimonthly journals